Acanthosybra is a genus of beetles in the family Cerambycidae, containing a single species, Acanthosybra lineolata. It was described by Stephan von Breuning in 1939.

It's 6.5 mm long and 1.75 mm wide, and its type locality is Marosika, Madagascar.

References

Apomecynini
Beetles described in 1939
Taxa named by Stephan von Breuning (entomologist)
Monotypic Cerambycidae genera